Dianthus nitidus, commonly known as the Carpathian glossy pink, is a herbaceous perennial plant belonging to the family Caryophyllaceae.

It is found in Slovakia, Serbia and Monetenegro and has most likely vanished from Poland. It had been recorded from the Pieniny in the 19th century but not seen since.

References

nitidus
Flora of Slovakia
Flora of Serbia
Flora of Montenegro